Pierre-Luc Périchon (born 4 January 1987) is a French professional road and track bicycle racer, who currently rides for UCI WorldTeam .

Career
Born in Bourg-en-Bresse, Périchon has competed as a professional since the start of the 2012 season, having signed a deal with the  team in August 2011. Périchon has also been a member of the VC Ambérieu, Saint-Vulbas CC, and SCO Dijon amateur teams.

Having featured highly in several domestic races during his career, Périchon won his first UCI Europe Tour race in April 2012, by winning the Paris–Camembert race. Attacking  from the finish in Camembert, Périchon won a three-man sprint to the finish line ahead of 's Cyril Bessy and 's Jean-Marc Bideau. He was named in the start list for the 2015 Tour de France and the 2016 Tour de France. In October 2020, he was named in the startlist for the 2020 Vuelta a España.

Major results

2003
 1st  Madison, National Novice Track Championships
2004
 1st  Madison, National Junior Track Championships
2005
 2nd Points race, National Junior Track Championships
2006
 2nd Points race, National Under-23 Track Championships
2007
 National Track Championships
3rd Madison
3rd Under-23 points race
2008
 2nd Madison, National Track Championships
 2nd Tour du Charolais
 6th Overall Tour des Pays de Savoie
2009
 1st GP Blangy
 3rd Tour du Haut-Berry
 7th Overall Tour Alsace
 8th Paris–Tours Espoirs
2010
 1st Beuvry la Forêt
 1st Stage 3 Tour de Franche Comté
 5th Overall Rhône-Alpes Isère Tour
2011
 1st  Overall Les Boucles de l'Artois
 1st GP Blangy
 1st Stage 5 Tour Nivernais Morvan
 2nd Points race, National Track Championships
 2nd Overall Tour du Loir-et-Cher
1st Stage 2
2012
 1st Paris–Camembert
 9th Overall Étoile de Bessèges
 9th Overall Boucles de la Mayenne
2013
 7th Overall Tour de Bretagne
1st Stage 7
 7th Tro-Bro Léon
2014
 3rd Tour du Doubs
 4th Tro-Bro Léon
 8th Paris–Tours
 8th Chrono des Nations
2015
 3rd Overall Boucles de la Mayenne
 4th Overall Tour de Langkawi
 5th Tro-Bro Léon
 9th Overall Tour des Pays de Savoie
  Combativity award Stage 14 Tour de France
2016
 1st Stage 3 Tour de Savoie Mont-Blanc
 9th Overall Giro di Toscana
2017
 1st Duo Normand (with Anthony Delaplace)
 Tour de Savoie Mont-Blanc
1st  Mountains classification
1st Stage 5
 4th Road race, National Road Championships
 5th Overall Three Days of De Panne
2018
 1st Polynormande
 4th Duo Normand (with Anthony Delaplace)
 8th Road race, UEC European Road Championships
 9th Tour du Doubs
2019
 2nd Paris–Camembert
2021
 2nd Paris–Camembert
 3rd Overall Tour du Limousin
 5th Tour de Vendée
 7th Boucles de l'Aulne
 9th Tour du Doubs
2023
 6th Grand Prix La Marseillaise

Grand Tour general classification results timeline

References

External links

La Pomme Marseille profile

French male cyclists
1987 births
Living people
Sportspeople from Bourg-en-Bresse
Cyclists from Auvergne-Rhône-Alpes